Amabiline is a pyrrolizidine alkaloid first isolated in 1967 from Cynoglossum amabile.  It is also found in the seeds and flowers of borage (Borago officinalis) and in borage seed oil.

Chemically, it is the ester derived from viridifloric acid and supinidine.

Amabiline is hepatotoxic and may contribute to the potential liver damage caused by consumption of borage and its seed oil.

References

pyrrolizidine alkaloids
Esters
Diols